The Rinderhorn is a mountain of the Bernese Alps, overlooking Leukerbad in the canton of Valais. It lies east of Gemmi Pass on the chain culminating at the Balmhorn.

References

External links

Rinderhorn on Summitpost
Rinderhorn on Hikr

Mountains of the Alps
Alpine three-thousanders
Mountains of Switzerland
Mountains of Valais